Gareth Yuen is an Australian actor who portrays the character Dax Lo, the Blue Ranger on the 2007 television series Power Rangers: Operation Overdrive. He appeared at the Power Morphicon in June 2007.
He is a graduate of Sydney's National Institute of Dramatic Art (NIDA).

Career
Yuen has been on many Australian films television shows ranging from Sky Trackers, Neighbours, Head Start, Bed of Roses, Kath & Kim, Underbelly, and Party Tricks. He was cast in Knowing starring Nicolas Cage and Liam Hemsworth. He was the Blue Ranger Dax Lo in Power Rangers: Operation Overdrive in 2007 and in 2011, he appeared in the New Zealand independent feature My Wedding and Other Secrets alongside Michelle Ang and Cheng Pei-pei.

In 2016, he was cast in comedian and The Daily Show senior correspondent Ronny Chieng's comedy series Ronny Chieng: International Student, which was part of the Australian Broadcasting Corporation's Comedy Showroom where viewers vote which pilot they want green lit.

In 2019, he joined the main cast for SBS's limited series Hungry Ghosts.

Filmography

Film

Television

References

External links
 

1978 births
20th-century Australian male actors
21st-century Australian male actors
Australian child actors
Australian male child actors
Australian male television actors
Australian people of Chinese descent
Living people
Male actors from Melbourne
National Institute of Dramatic Art alumni
Male actors of Chinese descent
Australian people of Asian descent